The Swinging Buddy Rich is a jazz album of songs recorded in Los Angeles in 1953 and 1954 by Buddy Rich with Harry "Sweets" Edison and others.  The first 6 tracks were released on a 10-inch Norgran Records LP in 1954.  An expanded 12 inch Norgran LP version with 3 additional tracks from 1955 was later released.

Track listing
"Let's Fall in Love" (Harold Arlen, Ted Koehler) – 2:50
"Me and My Jaguar" (Rich) – 3:48
"Just Blues" (Edison, Rich) – 6:27
"Sweets' Opus No. 1" (Edison) – 2:37	
"Strike It Rich" (Johnny Mandel) – 6:32
"Sportin' Life" ("Sweetie Pie") (Edison) – 2:36
"Sonny and Sweets" (Rich, Edison) – 4:42
"The Two Mothers" (Rich, Edison) – 6:01
"Willow Weep for Me" (Ann Ronell) – 7:02

tracks 1-3 = side A of the original 10" LP release (Norgran MGN 26)
tracks 4-6 = side B of the original release

Personnel
tracks 1-3 (recorded 1953):
Buddy Rich – drums
Harry "Sweets" Edison – trumpet
John Simmons – bass 
Jimmy Rowles – piano 
Benny Carter – alto saxophone 
Georgie Auld – tenor saxophone 
Bob Lawson – baritone saxophone 
Milt Bernhardt – trombone
Johnny Mandel - arranger
tracks 4-6 (recorded 1954):
Buddy Rich – drums 
Harry "Sweets" Edison – trumpet
Joe Comfort – bass 
Gerald Wiggins – piano 
Willie Smith – alto saxophone
Tom Brown – tenor saxophone 
Bob Poland – baritone saxophone 
Milt Bernhardt – trombone 
Jack Costanzo – bongos 
tracks 7-9 (recorded 1955): 
Buddy Rich – drums 
Harry "Sweets" Edison – trumpet
John Simmons – bass 
Jimmy Rowles – piano 
Sonny Criss – alto saxophone (tracks 7, 8)
Barney Kessel – guitar (track 9)

References
Notes

Sources
Norgran MGN 26 (original 1954 10 inch LP release)
Norgran MGN 1052 (expanded 12 inch LP release)
Verve MGV 8142 (1957 re-issue)

1954 albums
Buddy Rich albums
Albums produced by Norman Granz
Norgran Records albums
Verve Records albums